Elizaveta Aleksandrovna Lugovskikh (born May 26, 2000 in Voronezh, Voronezh Oblast) is a Russian-Montenegrin individual rhythmic gymnast currently representing Montenegro at international competitions.

Career 
Lugovskikh debuted in the senior international scene at the 2017 Moscow Senior International tournament. She finished 17th in the all-around at the 2017 Russian Championships. On March 31-April 2, Lugovskikh won silver in the all-around at the 2017 Irina Deleanu Cup. She then competed at tournament the "2017 Citta di Pesaro" where she won the all-around gold medal, she also qualified 2 apparatus finals taking gold in ribbon and ball. On May 12-14, Lugovskikh competed in her first World Challenge Cup at the 2017 Portimao World Cup where she won silver in the all-around behind teammate Iuliia Bravikova, she qualified to all the apparatus finals taking gold in clubs, silver in ball, bronze in hoop and 4th in ribbon. On June 23-25, Lugovskikh competed at the International Tournament of Holon finishing 5th in the all-around behind Mariya Trubach.

References

External links 
 
 Elizaveta Lugovskikh profile 
 
 

2000 births
Living people
Russian rhythmic gymnasts
Sportspeople from Voronezh
21st-century Russian women